Papal appointment was a medieval method of selecting a pope. Popes have always been selected by a council of Church fathers, however, Papal selection before 1059 was often characterized by confirmation or nomination by secular European rulers or by their predecessors. The later procedures of the papal conclave are in large part designed to constrain the interference of secular rulers which characterized the first millennium of the Roman Catholic Church, and persisted in practices such as the creation of crown-cardinals and the jus exclusivae. Appointment might have taken several forms, with a variety of roles for the laity and civic leaders, Byzantine and Germanic emperors, and noble Roman families. The role of the election vis-a-vis the general population and the clergy was prone to vary considerably, with a nomination carrying weight that ranged from near total to a mere suggestion or ratification of a prior election.

The institution has its origins in late antiquity, where on more than one occasion the emperor stepped in to resolve disputes over the legitimacy of papal contenders. An important precedent from this period is an edict of Emperor Honorius, issued after a synod he convoked to depose Antipope Eulalius. The power passed to (and grew with) the King of the Ostrogoths, then the Byzantine Emperor (or his delegate, the Exarch of Ravenna). After an interregnum, the Kings of the Franks and the Holy Roman Emperor (whose selection the pope also sometimes had a hand in), generally assumed the role of confirming the results of papal elections. For a period (today known as the "saeculum obscurum"), the power passed from the Emperor to powerful Roman nobles—the Crescentii and then the Counts of Tusculum.

In many cases, the papal coronation was delayed until the election had been confirmed. Some antipopes were similarly appointed. The practice ended with the conclusion of the Investiture Controversy (c.f. confirmation of bishops) due largely to the efforts of Cardinal Hildebrand (future Pope Gregory VII), who was a guiding force in the selection of his four predecessors, and the 1059 papal bull In Nomine Domini of Pope Nicholas II; some writers consider this practice to be an extreme form of "investiture" in and of itself.

Although the practice was forbidden by the Council of Antioch (341) and the Council of Rome (465), the bishops of Rome, as with other bishops, often exercised a great deal of control over their successor, even after the sixth century. In addition, most popes from the fourth to twelfth century were appointed or confirmed by a secular power.

Ancient Rome
As to the earliest ages, St. Peter himself constituted a senate for the Roman Church, consisting of twenty-four priests and deacons. These were the councillors of the Bishop of Rome and the electors of his successors. This statement is drawn from a canon in the "Corpus Juris Canonici" (can. "Si Petrus", caus. 8, Q. 1). Historians and canonists, however, generally hold that the Roman bishopric was filled on its vacancy in the same manner as other bishoprics, that is, the election of the new pope was made by the neighbouring bishops and the clergy and faithful of Rome. Nevertheless, some maintain that the naming of the successor of St. Peter was restricted to the Roman clergy, and that the people were admitted to a part in the elections only after the time of Sylvester I (fourth century).

After Constantine had given peace to the Church, the Christian Roman emperors often took part in the institution of a new pope and at times their influence was very marked. From the fourth century onwards, therefore, a new force had to be reckoned with. The occasion for the interference of the Roman emperors and later of the kings of Italy was afforded by disputed elections to the papal chair. The most noted of the earlier instance was at the election of Boniface I (418). This gave occasion to the decree (c. 8, dist. 79) that when an election was disputed a new candidate should be chosen.

Ostrogoths
On November 22, 498, both Pope Symmachus and Antipope Laurentius were elected pope; both Byzantine Emperor Anastasius I and the Gothic King Theodoric the Great originally supported Laurentius, who was installed in the Lateran Palace, but Symmachus prevailed when Theodoric expelled Laurentius from Rome, fearing that he was too influenced by the Byzantine ruler.

Byzantine

Exarchate of Ravenna

Byzantine

Exarchate of Ravenna

Frankish interregnum

Kings of the Franks/Holy Roman Empire

Counts of Tusculum

Holy Roman Empire

Crescentii

Crescentius the Elder, the brother of Pope John XIII, had previously deposed and had strangled Pope Benedict VI, and helped install Antipope Boniface VII in Rome in opposition to the imperial candidates, Pope Benedict VII and Pope John XIV, the latter of which perished in the Castel Sant'Angelo like Benedict V. Crescentius the Younger, the son of Crescentius the Elder, likely had a strong hand in the election of Pope John XV, although the details of that papacy are incomplete and disputed. However, it is known that Crescentius the Younger deferred to Otto III, Holy Roman Emperor for the choice of the successor of John XV: Pope Gregory V, Otto III's cousin. Yet, not long afterward, disputes with the emperor and Gregory V caused Crescentius the Younger to support Antipope John XVI, who was deposed with some difficulty by Otto III, who proceeded to have John XVI mutilated and Crescentius the Younger killed.

Three years later, after a revolt in Rome involving John Crescentius, the son of Crescentius the Younger, Otto III and Pope Sylvester II were expelled from Rome; the three successors of Sylvester II (who was later permitted to return to Rome) were appointed by John Crescentius before he died in the spring of 1012, nearly simultaneously with Sergius IV, allowing the Counts of Tusculum to displace the Crescentii.

Counts of Tusculum

Unlike the Tusculan popes during the "Pornocracy", Benedict VIII, John XIX, and Benedict IX were the Count of Tusculum themselves immediately prior to their becoming pope. Benedict VIII subjugated the Crescentii and made peace with the Holy Roman Empire, crowning Henry II, Holy Roman Emperor on February 14, 1014, nearly two years after his accession to the papacy.

Holy Roman Empire

List of anti-papal appointments

Notes

References
Coulombe, Charles A. 2003. Vicars of Christ: A History of the Popes. Citadel Press. .
Dahmus, Joseph Henry. 1984. Dictionary of medieval civilization. Macmillan. .
Graboïs, Aryeh. 1980. The Illustrated Encyclopedia of Medieval Civilization. Octopus.
Greeley, Andrew M. 2005. The Making of the Pope. Little, Brown and Company. .
Hill, David Jayne. 1905. A history of diplomacy in the international development of Europe. Longmans, Green, and co.

Election of the Pope
Investiture Controversy
Right of presentation